Al Wakra station is the southern terminus of the Doha Metro's Red Line. It serves Al Wakrah Municipality, namely Al Wakrah City and Al Wukair.

History
As part of the metro's Phase 1, the station was inaugurated on 8 May 2019, along with most other Red Line stations.

Station details
Among the station's facilities are a Masraf Al Rayyan ATM, a Qatar National Bank ATM, a prayer room, restrooms and a carpark.

MetroLink Bus
MetroLink is the Doha Metro's free feeder bus network. There are a total of five metrolinks servicing the station:

M127, which serves Souq Al Wakrah.
M128, which serves Al Wakrah South.
M130, which serves Ezdan Village 4-7 (Al Wukair).
M131, which serves Ezdan Village 3 and 8–11 (Al Wukair).
M134, which serves Al Wakrah South and Al Wakrah Hospital

Connections
It is served by bus routes 109, 119, and 129. However, the recent inauguration of Al Wakra bus depot has made some changes to the bus numbers which leave to and from the Al Wakra bus depot along with metrolink buses.

References

Doha Metro stations
2019 establishments in Qatar
Railway stations opened in 2019
Transport in Al Wakrah